Sloan letters, designed by Louise Sloan in 1959, are a set of optotypes used to test visual acuity generally used in Snellen charts and logMAR charts.

This set of optotypes consists of ten specially formed "letters", C, D, H, K, N, O, R, S, V and Z. These letters, unlike the ones used in older Snellen charts, are designed to give acuity testing results that are comparable to tests made using Landolt rings.

Computer fonts for macOS and Microsoft Windows operating systems are available for research purposes. The fonts are based on Louise Sloan's design, which has been designated the US standard for acuity testing by the National Academy of Sciences, National Research Council, Committee on Vision (1980, Adv Ophthalmol, 41, 103–148).

See also
Eye chart
Landolt C
Lea test
Snellen chart

References 

Ophthalmology
Optotypes
Optometry